Krishnendu Chatterjee (Bengali: কৃষ্ণেন্দু চ্যাটার্জী) is an Indian computer scientist who is currently a professor at the Institute of Science and Technology Austria (ISTA). He is known for his contributions to theoretical computer science, especially in algorithmic game theory, evolutionary game theory, logics and automata theory.

Education 
Chatterjee obtained his BTech in Computer Science and Engineering from the Indian Institute of Technology Kharagpur. He gained his MSc and PhD from the University of California, Berkeley. His doctoral advisor was Thomas Henzinger.

Career 
He obtained his PhD in 2007 and later moved to UC Santa Cruz for a postdoc. He then joined ISTA in 2009 as an assistant professor and was promoted to professor in 2014. In his research, he studies graph games with omega-regular and quantitative objectives, especially variants with probabilistic moves, multiple objectives, and/or partial information. Recently, he has also been applying computational methods to evolutionary game theory. He has described the computational complexity of various evolutionary processes, and he has extended models of direct and indirect reciprocity.

Awards and honors 
 2001: President of India Gold Medal
2008: EACSL Ackermann Award
2008: David J. Sakrison Memorial Prize
 2011: ERC Starting Grant from the European Research Council
 2020: ERC Consolidator Grant from the European Research Council

References 

1978 births
Living people
Indian academics
Indian computer scientists
IIT Kharagpur alumni
University of California, Berkeley alumni